Drymaeus acervatus is a species of tropical air-breathing land snail, a terrestrial pulmonate gastropod mollusk in the family Bulimulidae.

This species is endemic to the Amazon river basin in Brazil.

References

Drymaeus
Endemic fauna of Brazil
Gastropods described in 1857
Molluscs of Brazil
Taxonomy articles created by Polbot